Turks & Caicos attended the 2002 Commonwealth Games in Manchester. It was their fourth time at the Games.
The nation sent just four male athletes to the Games, to compete in Athletics. They were:
Dwenney Musgrove, Men's 100 Meters 
David Lightbourne, Men's 200 Meters and Men's Long Jump
Reonardo Harvey, Men's 400 Meters
Elvis Smith, Men's Javelin
These four athletes failed to win any medals.

Medals

See also
2002 Commonwealth Games results

References

Nations at the 2002 Commonwealth Games
2002 in the Turks and Caicos Islands
2002